Mochiwala is a town in Pakistan located at 25 km from Jhang and 50 km from Faisalabad at Jhang-Faisalabad road.  It is central Headquarters of this area having all the facilities like education, health, union council office, police station and shopping market (Gojra Mor).

References  

Populated places in Jhang District
Jhang District